S5 is the code name for a planned class of Indian nuclear-powered ballistic missile submarines currently being developed for Indian Navy. S5 will weigh around twice as much as the preceding . It is expected to start production by 2022.

Design 
They are planned to be armed with up to twelve or sixteen K6 Submarine-launched ballistic missiles, each armed with multiple independently targetable reentry vehicles.

Development 
The Government of India made an assessment of India's capability to design and construct a class of three new ballistic missile submarines codenamed S5 in 2006 when it was realised that the reactor and payload capacity of the Arihant-class submarines was limited. These submarines were initially planned to be operationalised beginning in 2021 but were later delayed. This delay had prompted the Indian Government to sanction an additional Arihant-class submarine in 2012 to avoid the idling of the production line.

See also 
 Arihant-class submarine
 Indian Navy SSN programme
 Future of the Indian Navy

References

External links 

Ballistic missile submarines
Nuclear-powered submarines
Submarines of India
Proposed ships